Amnicola missouriensis, common name the Missouri amnicola, is a species of freshwater snail, an aquatic gastropod mollusk in the family Amnicolidae.

Shell description 
The shell is minute, imperforate, obliquely ovate, light brown. The surface of the shell is smooth except for slight growth-lines. The shell is composed of 3½ very convex whorls separated by unusually deep sutures. The apex is obtuse and often eroded. The last whorl is shortly deflexed in front in adult specimens.

The aperture is rotund-ovate, being slightly narrowed above, but not angular there. The aperture is not modified in form by the preceding whorl. The aperture is moderately oblique. The peristome is continuous, not closely appressed at the upper left side. The columellar margin is thick and calloused within.

The width of the shell is 1.3 mm. The height of the shell is 1.7 mm. The height of aperture is 0.8 mm. The shell of Amnicola missouriensis is much smaller than Bythinella aldrichi Call, shorter, with a thick and heavy columellar lip.

Distribution 
Type locality is Carter County, Missouri.

References
This article incorporates public domain text from reference.

Amnicola
Gastropods described in 1898